Thunder Bay and Rainy River was a federal electoral district represented in the House of Commons of Canada from 1904 to 1917. It was located in the northwestern part of the province of Ontario. This riding was created in 1903 from parts of Algoma riding.

It consisted of the territorial districts of Thunder Bay and Rainy River.

The electoral district was abolished in 1914 when it was redistributed between Fort William and Rainy River and Port Arthur and Kenora ridings.

Electoral history

|- 
  
|Liberal
|CONMEE, James 
|align="right"|  2,162
  
|Conservative
|MARKS, George T. 
|align="right"|1,734 
 
|Unknown
|PELTIER, L.L. 
|align="right"|638    
|}

|-
  
|Liberal
|CONMEE, James
|align="right"|4,562
  
|Conservative
|KEEFER, F.H.
|align="right"| 3,321 
 

|-
  
|Conservative
|CARRICK, John James  
|align="right"|acclaimed   
|}

See also 

 List of Canadian federal electoral districts
 Past Canadian electoral districts

External links 

 Website of the Parliament of Canada

Former federal electoral districts of Ontario